The town of Virajpet also spelled as Virajapete is the second town of the district of Kodagu (Coorg), in Karnataka. It is the main town of the Virajpet taluka, south of the district, in the Kerala-Karnataka border. The name is an abbreviation of Virarajendrapete after the former ruler of Kodagu, Virarajendra.

History
The name "Virajpet" is a shorter version of previous name "Virarajendrapet", named after the Haleri King Dodda Virarajendra who founded the town in 1792. He founded the town to commemorate his meeting with General Robert Abercromby, his ally against Tipu Sultan, the ruler of the Kingdom of Mysore, in 1791. It was the headquarters of Yedenalknad taluk.

Demographics 
Virajpet has a population of 17,246 as per the 2011 Census of India. The number of males was 8,724 and females 8,522, thus a gender ration of 977 females to 1,000 males. Virajpet's literacy rate is 93.12 per cent, significantly higher than the national average of 74.04 per cent. The rate among males was 92.75 per cent and 95.46 per cent in females. 1,641 in number, 9.52 per cent of the population fall in the under-six age group.

Languages
The most widely spoken languages in Virajpet taluk are Malayalam, Kodava, Kannada and Tulu in descending order.

Civic administration

The Virajpet Town Panchayat is the municipality in charge of the civic and infrastructural assets of the town. The municipal council consists of 18 elected representatives, called councillors, one from each of the 18 wards (localities) of the town. A councillor from the majority party is selected as a President.

For elections to the Lok Sabha, Virajpet falls under the Mysore constituency. Prior to revision of the constituencies by the Delimitation commission in 2008, the town came under Mangalore constituency. For elections to the State Legislative Assembly, the town falls under the constituency that, apart from the town, includes the surrounding villages, and sends one member to the assembly.

Transportation
The nearest railway stations are Thalassery and Kannur in Kerala, at a distance of 80 km each. K R Nagar ,Hassan and Mysore are other nearest Railway stations in Karnataka, at a distance of 138 km and 105 km respectively.

The nearest airports are Kannur International Airport in Kerala and Mangalore International Airport. Kannur International Airport is at a distance of 59 km from Virajpet and Mangalore International Airport is at a distance of 172 km from Virajpet. Iritty in Kerala is the nearest town and it is about 41 km away from here. There are frequent bus services operated by KSRTC as well as Kerala RTC.

See also 
 Aimangala
 Madikeri
 Mangalore
 Virajpet (Vidhan Sabha constituency)
 Kushalanagar
 Somwarpet
 Iritty

References

External links 

 Virajpet Town Panchayat Website

Cities and towns in Kodagu district